Daniel Innes (October 22, 1835 – July 20, 1918) operated dry-goods businesses in Illinois and Kansas, later a Los Angeles, California, real estate developer and investor. He went on to become a member of Los Angeles City Council for the period 1890-94.

Early life 
Innes was born October 22, 1835 in Lairg, Scotland to William and Catharine (MacDonald) Innes, and emigrated to Buffalo, New York, at the age of 14. He moved to Chicago, Illinois in 1865 and established a dry-goods business there. Four years later he opened a larger store in Elgin, Illinois. He married Sarah Katherine "S. Kate" Pease in Elgin, Illinois on March 3, 1870. In 1871 he opened another store in Lawrence, Kansas, with his brother, George Innes.

Together they moved to California in 1885 and engaged in real estate development, opening several tracts in Angelino Heights, Los Angeles. Innes built their house at 1329 Carroll Avenue near Echo Park in Angelino Heights, known as the Innes House. It was used as the exterior shots of "Haliwell Manor" in the CW television series "Charmed."

Career 
Innes made investments in the Breidenbach Iron Stone Company, to manufacture and sell machinery, wagons and hardware; Bisbee West Copper, mining in Arizona and the Stricker Hotel Company.

He was a member of the Los Angeles City Council in 1890-94, representing the 2nd Ward. He ran for re-election in 1894 but was defeated.

Personal life 
He had a hobby of collecting coins. Innes died on July 20, 1918, at the age of 83. He was survived by his wife, Sarah Katherine "S. Kate" Innes, and three children, Mrs. Willard J. Doran (Sarah), Walter P. Innes and William A. Innes.

External links
 "A Plain Statement From Councilman Innes" about the printing of ballots for city elections
 Photographs of the Daniel Innes house at 1329 Carroll Avenue, Angelino Heights

References

1835 births
1918 deaths
Businesspeople from Los Angeles
Los Angeles City Council members
19th-century American politicians
19th-century American businesspeople